Eusynthemis nigra is a species of dragonfly of the family Synthemistidae,
known as the black tigertail. 
It is a medium-sized dragonfly with black and yellow markings.
It inhabits streams in eastern Australia

Eusynthemis nigra appears similar to Eusynthemis brevistyla which is found in streams of south-eastern Australia.

Gallery

See also
 List of Odonata species of Australia

References

Synthemistidae
Odonata of Australia
Insects of Australia
Endemic fauna of Australia
Taxa named by Robert John Tillyard
Insects described in 1906